is a Japanese professional golfer.

Tokimatsu plays on the Japan Golf Tour and the Japan Challenge Tour. He had one win on each tour in 2016.

Tokimatsu made his debut on American soil at the 2018 WGC-Bridgestone Invitational, having qualified by virtue of his win at the 2017 Bridgestone Open.

Professional wins (4)

Japan Golf Tour wins (3)

*Note: The 2017 Bridgestone Open was shortened to 36 holes due to rain.

Japan Golf Tour playoff record (0–3)

Japan Challenge Tour wins (1)

Results in major championships

CUT = missed the half-way cut

Results in World Golf Championships

"T" = tied

Team appearances
Professional
Amata Friendship Cup (representing Japan): 2018

References

External links

Japanese male golfers
Japan Golf Tour golfers
Sportspeople from Fukuoka Prefecture
1993 births
Living people